Steven Alexander Smith (born April 12, 1983) is an American professional basketball player. He is a 6'9" (2.06 m) tall power forward. He played college basketball for the La Salle Explorers.

College career
Smith is a graduate of Northeast High School, and later La Salle University, where he won the Atlantic 10 Player of the Year Award twice, in 2005 and 2006.

Professional career
After starting the 2006-07 NBA season with the Philadelphia 76ers, Smith was waived in January 2007. In eight total NBA games, he averaged 0.6 points and 0.8 rebounds per game. He also played for the Anaheim Arsenal of the D-League during the 2007-08 season.

In February 2008, he joined the Italian League pro club Solsonica Rieti and finished the 2007-08 season there. He signed with the Greek League pro club Kolossos Rodou for the 2008-09 season. After averaging 18.3 points per game in 21 games, he suffered an Achilles tendon rupture and missed the rest of the season.

In August 2010, he signed with the German Eurocup team EWE Baskets Oldenburg, but he was released in December. He then played in Greece with Panellinios, and later with Panathinaikos.

On March 24, 2014 he was signed by the Austin Toros.

On August 8, 2014 he was signed by French team Bourg-en-Bresse.

On August 19, 2015, he signed with Élan Béarnais Pau-Orthez.

On June 23, 2016, Smith signed with Champagne Châlons-Reims.

On October 2, 2017, Smith signed in Argentina with Quimsa of the Liga Nacional de Básquet.

References

External links
NBA.com Profile
NBA Stats
NBA D-League Stats
FIBA.com Profile
Euroleague.net Profile
Eurobasket.com Profile
Draftexpress.com Profile
Spanish League Stats 
Italian League Profile 

1983 births
Living people
American expatriate basketball people in France
American expatriate basketball people in Germany
American expatriate basketball people in Greece
American expatriate basketball people in Israel
American expatriate basketball people in Italy
American men's basketball players
Anaheim Arsenal players
Basketball players from Philadelphia
Élan Béarnais players
Ironi Nahariya players
Israeli Basketball Premier League players
Kolossos Rodou B.C. players
La Salle Explorers men's basketball players
Liga ACB players
Panathinaikos B.C. players
Panellinios B.C. players
Philadelphia 76ers players
Power forwards (basketball)
Reims Champagne Basket players
Small forwards
Undrafted National Basketball Association players
Virtus Bologna players